The 1993 Italian Open was a tennis tournament held in 1993. It was the 50th edition of the Italian Open tennis tournament, and it was part of the Tier I Series of the 1993 WTA Tour and the ATP Super 9 of the 1993 ATP Tour. Both the men's and the women's events took place at the Foro Italico in Rome, Italy. The women's tournament was held from 3 May through 9 May 1993 and the men's tournament was held from 10 May through 17 May 1993.

Finals

Men's singles

 Jim Courier defeated  Goran Ivanišević, 6–1, 6–2, 6–2
It was Jim Courier's 4th title of the year and his 13th overall. It was his 2nd Masters title of the year and his 5th overall. It was his 2nd title at the event, also winning in 1992.

Women's singles

 Conchita Martínez defeated  Gabriela Sabatini, 7–5, 6–1
It was Conchita Martínez 3rd title of the year and her 14th overall. It was her 1st Tier I title.

Men's doubles

 Jacco Eltingh /  Paul Haarhuis defeated  Wayne Ferreira /  Mark Kratzmann, 6–4, 7–6

Women's doubles

 Jana Novotná /  Arantxa Sánchez Vicario defeated  Mary Joe Fernández /  Zina Garrison-Jackson, 6–4, 6–2

References

External links
Women's Singles draw
Women's Doubles draw